Sampson Flat is a locality northeast of Adelaide, South Australia in the City of Playford. It used to be known as Sampson's Flat. The area drains to the west into the Little Para Reservoir. It is a mixture of open pasture with scattered trees, and denser scrub on the higher eastern side.

Sampson Flat was possibly named after John H. Sampson, who arrived in South Australia in 1849 and resided at One Tree Hill.

Demographics
The 2016 Australian census by the Australian Bureau of Statistics counted 124 persons in Sampson Flat on census night. Of these, 52.1% were male and 47.9% were female.  The median age was 47 years and the average number of people per household was 2.6

Fires

Sampson Flat was the site of first ignition for a bushfire in the Adelaide Hills in January 2015.

References

	

Suburbs of Adelaide